Levan Sharashenidze (Levan Levanovich Sharashenidze) (born 24 March 1931) is a retired Soviet and Georgian military officer and former Defense Minister of Georgia (1992).

Education and career
Born in Tbilisi, Sharashenidze was trained at the Alma-Ata Airborne Service School. He also studied law at the Vilnius University and was further educated at the Lenin Military-Political Academy in Moscow. In 1953, he joined the Soviet military, going through the ranks from a paratrooper platoon commander to deputy chief of political directorate of the Transcaucasian Military District (1976-1979) and military commissar of the Georgian Soviet Socialist Republic (1979-1992). In 1989 he was promoted to the rank of lieutenant-general of the Soviet army.

Service in independent Georgia
Sharashenidze retained his post of the country's military commissar after Georgia declared independence from the Soviet Union in April 1991. He was involved in a military coup against Georgia's first elected president Zviad Gamsakhurdia (December 1991–January 1992). In the course of the coup, the rebel Military Council appointed Sharashenidze Georgia's defense minister on January 3, 1992. On May 8, 1992, Eduard Shevardnadze, Georgia's new head of state, dismissed Sharashenidze as the minister, replacing him with Georgia National Guard chief Tengiz Kitovani. Sharashenidze was, instead, made a chief adviser to the Ministry of Defense of Georgia. In his capacity, he was present at the Georgian headquarters and was involved in the diplomatic efforts with Russia during the war with separatists in Abkhazia (1992–1993). He has described himself as being of a "pro-Russian" orientation. After 1995, Sharashenidze has had no noticeable political and military role in Georgia.

References

    
    
    
    
    

1931 births
Living people
Generals from Georgia (country)
Soviet Georgian generals
Government ministers of Georgia (country)
Military personnel from Tbilisi
Soviet lieutenant generals
Lenin Military Political Academy alumni
Ryazan Guards Higher Airborne Command School alumni